The First United Methodist Church is a historic Methodist church located at 703 Lee Avenue  in Lafayette, Louisiana.

Built in 1924, it is a three-story building in Classical Revival style, with a five-bay front facade and a pedimented portico with four Ionic columns.  It was designed by architect J.A. Baylor and built by contractor Knapp & East.  According to its NRHP nomination it is one of only three buildings in Lafayette Parish known to have a monumental portico;  of those it is "the only one with ornamental fenestration surrounds. It is therefore one of the parish's most pretentious and most high style period buildings."

The church was added to the National Register of Historic Places on June 21, 1984.

See also
 National Register of Historic Places listings in Lafayette Parish, Louisiana

References

United Methodist churches in Louisiana
Churches on the National Register of Historic Places in Louisiana
Neoclassical architecture in Louisiana
Churches completed in 1924
Churches in Lafayette Parish, Louisiana
Churches in Lafayette, Louisiana
Lafayette Parish, Louisiana
National Register of Historic Places in Lafayette Parish, Louisiana
Neoclassical church buildings in the United States